Lieve Slegers (born 6 April 1965 in Turnhout, Flanders) is a former long-distance runner from Belgium, who won the Rotterdam Marathon on 28 April 1996 clocking 2:28:06. She represented her native country at the 1988 Summer Olympics in the women's 10,000 metres, where she was eliminated in the qualifying heats. Slegers also competed at the 1992 Summer Olympics. She was the 1995 winner of the 20 km of Brussels.

She was also a cross country runner – Slegers won the Cross Internacional de Venta de Baños in 1989. She was successful domestically, winning the Lotto Cross Cup series in 1991–92 and 1994–95. She also won the 1992 Eurocross competition in neighbouring Luxembourg.

International competitions

Notes:
Results with (h) indicates overall position in qualifying heats.
Slegers qualified for the 1987 World Championship final but failed to finish.

References

External links

1965 births
Living people
Sportspeople from Turnhout
Belgian female long-distance runners
Belgian female marathon runners
Olympic athletes of Belgium
Athletes (track and field) at the 1988 Summer Olympics
Athletes (track and field) at the 1992 Summer Olympics
World Athletics Championships athletes for Belgium
20th-century Belgian women